Still Night, Still Light is a Canadian drama film, directed by Sophie Goyette and released in 2016. The film stars Éliane Préfontaine as Éliane, a woman dealing with depression who temporarily abandons her life in Montreal and travels to Mexico City, where she stays at a home owned by Romes (Gerardo Trejoluna) and takes a job teaching his son to play piano; Romes, meanwhile, is planning to accompany his ailing father Pablo (Felipe Casanova) on a trip to Asia which may be Pablo's last major dream in his life.

The film's cast also includes Marie-Ginette Guay and Monique Spaziani. It is thematically related to, but not a direct remake of, Goyette's 2011 short film La Ronde, which also starred Préfontaine.

The film premiered at the 2016 Festival du nouveau cinéma, before opening commercially in January 2017.

The film was a nominee for the DGC Discovery Award at the 2017 Directors Guild of Canada awards. It was shortlisted for the Prix collégial du cinéma québécois in 2018.

References

External links
 

2016 films
2016 drama films
Canadian drama films
Films directed by Sophie Goyette
Films shot in Mexico
Films set in Mexico
2010s Canadian films